The Elvis Rock is a rock alongside the A44 in Powys, Wales, near its border with Ceredigion. It is one of the most well known pieces of graffiti in Wales, with the word "ELVIS" written on it. The rock is located beside the main trunk road through the country, and appears out of context with the surrounding landscape.

History
The graffiti on the rock allegedly originally read “Ellis” and was written in 1962 by John Hefin and David Meredith in support of a local Plaid Cymru candidate, Islwyn Ffowc Elis, but misspelt. The rock has been repainted several times, and at one point the text was obliterated. However the word "Elvis" has again reappeared on the rock and is still visible today.

References

External links
 Photos of the Elvis Rock from the BBC website.

Landmarks in Wales
Buildings and structures in Powys
Graffiti in the United Kingdom
1962 works